B.A.T. II – The Koshan Conspiracy is a futuristic point and click adventure game written by Computer's Dream and published by Ubi Soft in 1992. It is the sequel to the 1990 game B.A.T.

It is a futuristic role-playing game in which the player explores the city, talks to non-player characters, tries to solve puzzles, travels to new cities by use of a mini-game, buys weapons and ammo, engages in fire fights (also by way of a mini-game), buys a spaceship, and enters space. The player can even re-wire a wrist computer (B.O.B) in the game to perform different functions. It has a very open, non-linear play style.

The Amiga and Atari ST versions shipped with a physical dongle to prevent piracy.

The box art was painted by Luis Royo.

Reception
Computer Gaming World stated that Koshan "was clearly a superior product" to its predecessor, with a much larger game world and both strategic and action combat options. The magazine concluded that it was "an enormous game, offering a richly textured, futuristic gameworld that gamers can find themselves easily drawn into".

References

External links
 

1992 video games
Adventure games
Amiga games
Atari ST games
DOS games
Video game sequels
Cyberpunk video games
Video games developed in France
Ubisoft games
Single-player video games